Alberto Solanas Galán (born 6 November 1955) is a Spanish athlete. He competed in the men's long jump at the 1980 Summer Olympics.

References

1955 births
Living people
Athletes (track and field) at the 1980 Summer Olympics
Spanish male long jumpers
Olympic athletes of Spain
Place of birth missing (living people)